Memsource is a cloud-based commercial translation management system and computer-assisted translation (CAT) tool. It is developed by Memsource a.s., headquartered in Prague, Czech Republic. According to research by Deloitte, in 2020 Memsource a.s was one of the top 50 fastest growing IT companies in the Czech Republic.

History 
Memsource was founded in 2010 by David Čaněk. Memsource Cloud was launched for the public at the beginning of 2011.

In the third quarter of 2015 Memsource translated over a billion words on its platform for the first time.

In May 2018, Memsource was granted a patent for its AI non-translatables feature and in October 2018, launched its second AI feature, a quality estimation endpoint to enable users to see MT quality scores before post-editing

In 2019, Memsource was ranked as the Most Viable Product in the Marketflex for Language-Oriented TMS, published by Common Sense Advisory (CSA) research.

In July 2020, The Carlyle Group acquired a controlling share in Memsource for an undisclosed sum.

In January 2021, Memsource a.s acquired the Hamburg-based TMS Phrase.

Features
Memsource’s features include support for translation memory, termbases, automatic quality assurance, CMS connectors, REST API, and 3rd party machine translation engine connectors. Machine translation is also natively supported through the Memsource Translate hub, which includes AI-powered management features such as fully managed engines, MT Autoselect and machine translation quality estimation. The platform supports over 50 file types, including custom file types.

Memsource is available for Windows, Mac, and Linux systems. It is also accessible through a mobile application on Android and iOS devices.

References

External links 
www.memsource.com 

Machine translation software
Translation software
Software companies of the Czech Republic
Translation companies